Traitor is a 2007 novel by New Zealand author Stephen Daisley. It won the Prime Minister's Literary Award in Australia in 2011 for Best Fiction.

Plot summary

Young New Zealand soldier David Monroe is fighting at Gallipoli in World War I when he meets a Turkish doctor, Mohammad.  As they tend to a wounded soldier a bomb bursts nearby and both are sent to an army hospital on the island of Lemnos.  The novel explores the growing friendship between the two men, and two cultures, as they recover from their wounds.

Notes
 Dedication: Dedicated to the memory of C.A. Daisley - née Lal Radcliffe 1920-2009 
 Epigraph: "I hate the idea of causes, and if I had to choose between betraying my country and betraying my friend, I hope I would have the guts to betray my country." - E.M. Forster

Review

James Bradley in The Australian noted: "At its best, Daisley's prose possesses a shimmering, allusive beauty reminiscent of John McGahern. Sequences such as the stunning description of the ageing David's journey out into a rainy morning to supervise the lambing lend the novel an almost sacred quality."

Awards and nominations

 2010 shortlisted Western Australian Premier's Book Awards — Fiction 
 2011 shortlisted Commonwealth Writer's Prize - South East Asia and South Pacific Region — Best First Book 
 2011 shortlisted New South Wales Premier's Literary Awards — Christina Stead Prize for Fiction 
 2011 winner New South Wales Premier's Literary Awards — UTS Award for New Writing 
 2011 winner Prime Minister's Literary Awards — Fiction

References

2010 novels
21st-century New Zealand novels
New Zealand historical novels
Novels set during World War I